Vanda coerulescens, also known as sky-blue vanda, is a species of monopodial orchid native to Assam and Arunachal Pradesh, India, eastern Himalayas, southern Yunnan province in China, Myanmar and Thailand.

Description
The average height of V. coerulescens is between 30 and 60 cm. It has evergreen, apically bilobed strap leaves. It s an epiphytic perennial orchid species with erect or drooping axillary raceme inflorescences from terete stems. Inflorescences are long that may reach more than 30 cm, producing multiple fragrant and showy blue coloured flowers of about 3 cm. Its lip is oblong-lanceolate shaped with yellow-orange colour base, yellow mid-part and white apex. Outside of the lip has a white base colour and violet mid-part and apex. Sepals are tessellated netted and strikes/striped.

Growth conditions
Indoors it prefers very bright filtered light, growing well in intermediate to warm temperature. It is best grown in well drained soil in clay, basket (best option) or plastic pots and watered frequently. Like all Vandas, V. coerulescens grows best in wooden slat baskets with no media. Its flowers are long lasting. 
 
Outdoors V. coerulescens is a terrestrial species that grows in hot to cool areas at elevations of 300 to 1200 meters, often found on tree trunks in open forests. It has been reported to flower in August to October.

References

External links

coerulescens
Orchids of India
Flora of Arunachal Pradesh
Orchids of Yunnan